A civil servant is the state employees of Azerbaijan. Everyone who works in the civil service must be a citizen of Azerbaijan according to the law of the Republic of Azerbaijan On Civil Service. Civil servants should be provided with a salary allocated from the state budget in accordance with the same law.

Duties 
The civil servant should fulfill the following duties:

 to carry out laws and other standard legitimate acts adopted by public authorities; 
 to execute orders issued by managers;
 to obey the service regulations determined by public authorities; 
 to avoid any activity that can cause difficulties in the work of other employees as well as actions that can be harmful to the reputation of the public authority he/she works in; 
timely review the appeals of citizens, organizations and enterprises and resolve them impartially;
to keep private information of state and other privileged insights secured by law counting in case of civil service termination; 
to keep private a data uncovered amid execution of official obligations and related to the private life, honour and respect of the citizens, not request such data excepting the cases expected by law. 
to follow the ethical behavior rules.

Rights 
According to the law of the Republic, civil servants have the following rights:

 to require and get from the public authorities, open organizations the data and materials required for satisfaction of his/her official obligations in determined order; 
 to require composed recognizable proof of his/her official obligations and arrangement of conditions for its satisfaction from the state authorities entitled to designate and expel a gracious worker from position;
 to receive state wages;
 to claim the benefit advancement or increment of state compensation considering professional development and satisfaction of official duties; 
 to be locked in logical and imaginative movement, to be included in educational and other paid movement with a consent of the head of state body he/she serves in;
 to obtain a benefit from stores, securities, rent;
 at the primary ask, to familiarize with all documents of his/her individual record, references and other reports being recorded in that, as well as to request incorporation of his/her explanations to the private file;
 to request conducting of official examination in arrange to negate a data damaging his/her respect and dignity; 
 to secure his/her legitimate rights and interface in important bodies and court; 
 to connect exchange unions.

References 

Azerbaijan
Government of Azerbaijan